Åsa Charlotte Regnér, originally Pettersson (born 26 August 1964 in Malmberget, Norrbotten) is a Swedish Social Democratic politician. On 3 October 2014, she became Minister for Children and the Elderly and Minister for Gender Equality under Stefan Löfven.

On March 6, 2018, Regnér resigned from her position in the Swedish government upon becoming the Deputy Executive Director of UN Women.

References

1964 births
Living people
Swedish Ministers for Gender Equality
Women government ministers of Sweden